Corbin James Lacina (born November 2, 1970) is a former American football offensive lineman and Midwest Emmy award-winning sports broadcaster who played eleven seasons in the National Football League, mainly for the Buffalo Bills and Minnesota Vikings.  He played high school football for Cretin-Derham Hall High School and college football at Augustana College. During his NFL career he was given the nickname Karate Corbin, because he is an 8th degree black belt.

References

1970 births
Living people
American football offensive guards
Augustana (South Dakota) Vikings football players
Buffalo Bills players
Carolina Panthers players
Minnesota Vikings players
Chicago Bears players
Sportspeople from Mankato, Minnesota
Players of American football from Minnesota
People from Sunfish Lake, Minnesota